Oettinger Brauerei is a brewery group in Germany.

Oettinger's headquarters are in Oettingen in Bayern but they also have breweries in Mönchengladbach and Braunschweig. They had a brewery in Gotha however this was closed in late 2022.

Affordable beer
Oettinger bought the brewery producing "5,0 Original" beer in Braunschweig, a competitor in the same market segment. Oettinger is rarely found on tap in pubs and bars – most of it is sold bottled in supermarkets.

It is also exported – in Australia Oettinger Pils is directly imported by the Endeavour Group liquor outlets where it is sold in 330 mL bottles, as well as 500 mL cans.

Oettinger uses several ways to keep beer prices low:

 Oettinger does not advertise.
 Oettinger does not involve any intermediaries; brewery-owned trucks deliver directly to stores.
 The brewing process is highly automated and uses few employees to brew vast amounts of beer.

A stronger version, "Oettinger super forte" (8.9% alcohol by volume), is also available in Italy.

History
The "Fürstliche Brauhaus zu Oettingen" (Prince's brewhouse at Oettingen) was bought in 1956 by the Kollmar family and renamed "Oettinger Brauerei GmbH".

Oettinger Group claims that its beer is brewed in accordance with the Reinheitsgebot.

Sponsorship
From 2006 until 2018, Oettinger was the official sponsor of Rockets, a professional basketball club based in Gotha. The Rockets played as "Oettinger Rockets" in Germany's first division, the Basketball Bundesliga.

See also

 Beer in Germany#Brands and breweries
 List of brewing companies in Germany

References

German companies established in 1731
Breweries in Germany
Beer brands of Germany
Companies based in Bavaria
Donau-Ries